Dabang Sarkar is a 2018 Indian Bhojpuri-language action drama film directed by Yogesh Raj Mishra and produced by Deepak Kumar and Rahul Vohra. It stars Khesari Lal Yadav and Akansha Awshthi. Sanjay Pandey, Deepika Tripathi, Anoop Arora, Samarth Chaturvedi, CP Bhatt, Jayashankat Pandey, Vineet Vishal and others play supporting roles. Kajal Raghwani makes a special appearance in a song.

The Uttar Pradesh Government have subsided the taxes on the film.

Cast
 Khesari Lal Yadav as Veeru/Veer Pratap Singh
 Kajal Raghwani as Special Appearance
 Aakansha Awshthi as 
 Deepika Tripathi as Pari
 Sanjay Pandey as Inspector Tripathi
 Krishna Kumar as Inspector Ajay
 Anoop Arora as Veeru's Father
 Samarth Chaturvedi as MLA
 C P Bhatt as Constable
 Vineet Vishal
 Jay Shanker Pandey
 Mahesh Chandra Deva
 Sandeep Yadav
 Ayushi Tiwari
 Subhash
 Pradeep Yadav
 Ajay Singh
 Dinesh Tiwari

Production
The script of "Dabang Sarkar" is written by Manoj Pandey and Yogesh Raj Mishra, while Production is designed by Amit Rishi Ramadevi. Cinematography by Amitabh Chandra and  Ravindranath Guru (Second Unit DOP) while Amit Rishi Ramadevi and Mahtab Haider is the editor. Background music was scored by Narendra Sinha and Vinay. DI by Yogesh Mishra and Amit Kumar, while VFX was done by Gaurav Kumar.

Soundtrack

The soundtrack for "Dabang Sarkar" was composed by Dhananjay Mishra, with lyrics penned by Pyare Lal Yadav & Azad Singh. It was produced under the "Yashi Films" label. Background music was scored by Narendra Sinha and Vinay. The soundtrack was released in Zee Music Company, which consists of seven songs. The full album is recorded by Khesari Lal Yadav, Priyanka Singh, Alok Kumar, Rini Chandra, Honey B, Neetu Singh and Jeetendra Singh.

Tracklist

Marketing and release 
On 8 May 2018, Yogesh Raj Mishra unveiled the first look poster of the film. The three official teasers of the film were released first on 29 May 2018, second on 7 June 2018 and third on 15 June 2018 respectively by Yashi Films on YouTube. Official trailer of the film was released on 31 August 2018 by Zee Music Bhojpuri official YouTube handel and he crossed over 4.9 million views until now.

The film was released in India on 30 November 2018.

The film was released at Online video platform site YouTube  on 5 February 2019 at the official channel of "Yashi Films" and quickly became the top trending video with 4 million views in few days. As of May 2020, the film has amassed over 22 million view on YouTube.

Award and nominations

References

2018 films
Indian action drama films
2010s Bhojpuri-language films
2018 action drama films